The Senedd constituencies and electoral regions are the electoral districts used to elect Members of the Senedd (MS) to the Senedd (Welsh Parliament), and have been used in some form since the first election of the then National Assembly for Wales in 1999.  New boundaries were introduced for the 2007 elections and currently consist of forty constituencies and five regions. The five electoral regions are: Mid and West Wales, North Wales, South Wales Central, South Wales East, and South Wales West, with the forty constituencies listed below. Voting last took place in all districts in the 2021 Senedd election, and are not used for local government.

The constituencies were created through the Government of Wales Act 1998, with the boundaries of the Welsh constituencies of the House of Commons of the Parliament of the United Kingdom (Westminster), as they were in 1999. The new boundaries were also used for the 2010 United Kingdom general election. Therefore, between the 2007 Assembly election and the 2010 United Kingdom general election, the two sets of constituencies, Assembly and Westminster, had differing boundaries. The Parliamentary Voting System and Constituencies Act 2011, unlinked the two sets of constituencies, meaning any changes to one set, no longer affects the other. This has allowed for differing proposals for constituencies in Wales, with separate proposals for an increase in Senedd constituencies and a decrease in UK Parliament constituencies in Wales.

Senedd constituencies are grouped into electoral regions consisting of between seven and nine constituencies. An additional member system is used to elect four additional Members of the Senedd from each region, in addition to the MSs elected by the constituencies. The Electoral Regions boundaries were based upon the pre-1999 European Parliament constituencies. At each general election of the Senedd, each elector has two votes, one constituency vote and one regional party-list vote. Each constituency elects one Member by the first past the post (single-member district plurality, SMDP) system, and the additional Senedd seats are filled from regional closed party lists, under the D'Hondt method, with constituency results being taken into account, to produce a degree of proportional representation for each region.  Altogether, the sixty Members of the Senedd are elected from the forty constituencies and five electoral regions, creating a Senedd of forty constituency MSs and twenty additional MSs. Every constituent is represented by one constituency member and four regional members.

History

Establishment 
Following the 1997 Welsh devolution referendum, where a narrow majority voted in support for the creation of a devolved Welsh Assembly, constituencies of the devolved legislature were established.

Section 2 of the Government of Wales Act 1998 stipulates that the constituencies for the National Assembly for Wales be the same as the constituencies used for elections to the United Kingdom Parliament. The same act sets out the creation of five regions which would use the same borders as the five European Parliamentary constituencies in Wales which themselves were set out in the European Parliamentary Constituencies (Wales) Order 1994, used for elections to the European Parliament between 1994 and 1999. The electoral regions set out are still used, despite the abolishment of the five European Parliamentary constituencies for a all-Wales constituency, and the withdrawal of the UK from the European Union. Although minor border adjustments to the regions have taken place.

Change in boundaries 
In 2006, the Government of Wales Act 2006 was enacted. When enacted the act reinforced the link between Assembly and UK Parliamentary constituencies, and that the number of electoral regions is five.

The Parliamentary Constituencies and Assembly Electoral Regions (Wales) Order 2006 defined the new borders for the constituencies and electoral regions.

The order detailed the abolition of three constituencies (Caernarfon, Conwy, and Meironnydd Nant Conwy), with three new constituencies to replace them (Aberconwy, Arfon, and Dwyfor Meirionnydd). Nine constituencies were subject to "substantial" border adjustments involving the transfer of more than 3,000 inhabitants between constituencies. A further eight constituencies were subject to boundary changes resulting in the redistribution of fewer than 3,000 inhabitants between each constituency, and a further four constituencies were subject to minor boundary adjustments that led to minimal transfers of inhabitants between constituencies. The remaining sixteen constituencies were not subject to any boundary or name modifications.

The three new constituencies straddled the border of the electoral regions of Mid and West Wales and North Wales, leading to adjustments in the boundaries of both electoral regions, in addition to minor adjustments to the constituency of Montgomeryshire also leading to minor regional boundary adjustments. In south Wales, the boundaries of the electoral regions, South Wales West, and South Wales Central were altered to accommodate changes to the boundaries of Bridgend, and Vale of Glamorgan constituencies.

The changes in the boundaries for constituencies and electoral regions of the Senedd came into force for the 2007 National Assembly for Wales election.

Delinking from UK parliament constituencies 
Section 13(1) of the Parliamentary Voting System and Constituencies Act 2011 states that: 

This details that any further changes to the UK Parliament constituencies in Wales specified in the act (notably the proposed reduction in constituencies to 30) will not be applied to Assembly (Senedd) constituencies.

In a session of the House of Commons where the then secretary of state for Wales, Cheryl Gillian was questioned on the Labour party's opposition to the decoupling of the two constituencies, she replied:

Re-naming 
On 6 May 2020, the Senedd and Elections (Wales) Act 2020 came into force, renaming the Assembly constituencies and Assembly electoral regions of the National Assembly for Wales, to the Senedd constituencies and Senedd electoral regions of "Senedd Cymru" or "the Welsh Parliament", known in both Welsh and English as the Senedd.

Constituencies 

Wales is made up of 40 constituencies for elections to the Senedd, the constituencies are currently the same but are not linked to those used for elections to the House of Commons of the United Kingdom, with each constituency containing a population of around 60,000.

The borders of each constituencies are drawn using Local government boundaries, defined in Parliamentary Voting System and Constituencies Act 2011 as "the boundaries of counties, county boroughs, electoral divisions, communities and community wards".

Boundary responsibility 

The Boundary Commission for Wales, a non-departmental public body, is responsible for proposing alterations to the boundaries of UK parliamentary constituencies in Wales, and reports proposals to the UK Government. Boundaries of Senedd constituencies and electoral regions are currently not overseen by any statutory review body, following the delinking of Senedd and UK Parliament constituencies in 2011, although the current configurations of both constituencies share the same boundaries (only the Senedd has electoral regions). Organisations such as the Electoral Reform Society Cymru have indicated a preference for coterminosity (meaning the mirroring of Senedd seat boundaries in Wales along the lines of the 2016 proposed reforms to the Welsh seats in the UK Parliament), however, such coterminosity is merely desired and is not enforced by law, meaning any changes to UK parliamentary constituencies in Wales do not necessarily need to be mirrored with the same changes for Senedd constituencies. If the differing proposals to constituencies in Wales, the proposed reduction of UK parliamentary constituencies and a proposed increase in Senedd constituencies in Wales are followed through, full coterminosity would be impossible. On 8 September 2021, a draft proposal of new UK parliamentary constituencies, reducing to 32, was published, with no plans to pass these changes to Senedd Constituencies, meaning the next UK general election may use different constituencies to the next Senedd election, once more.

Current constituencies

Former constituencies 
Between the first election in 1999 for the then National Assembly for Wales, to the 2007 election, there were three former constituencies. These constituencies were replaced at the 2007 election, with new boundaries and names.

Three constituency names, Conwy, Caernarfon, and Meirionydd Nant Conwy, have become historic, and the new boundaries define three constituencies with new names: Arfon, Dwyfor Meirionnydd, and Aberconwy. Generally, the new boundaries define each constituency taking into account local government ward boundaries, and define constituencies close to equal in terms of the sizes of their electorates.

Electoral regions 
Wales is organised into five electoral regions for elections to the Senedd. Each region contains between 7 and 9 constituencies within them. Each region elects four additional members of the Senedd and roughly contains 500,000 people.

See also 
 Boundary Commission for Wales

Notes

References

External links 

 List of Members at the Senedd website

National Assembly for Wales
 
Senedd electoral regions
Senedd constituencies and electoral regions